Amber Valley is an unincorporated community in northern Alberta, Canada, approximately  north of Edmonton. Originally named Pine Creek, Amber Valley was among several Alberta communities settled in the early 20th century by early Black immigrants to the province from Oklahoma and the Deep South of the United States. About 1,000 African Americans emigrated to Alberta from 1909-1911. Amber Valley is the location of the Obadiah Place provincial heritage site, a homestead of one of the first African-American settler families.

History 

In 1909, a group of 160 African-American homesteaders established the community. The homesteaders, African Americans from Oklahoma and Texas, were attracted by the government's promises of land to homestead, as it was trying to encourage immigrant settlers to develop the land. They were leaving Jim Crow conditions in the United States that discriminated against their rights.

Henry Parson Sneed, a clergyman and mason, led a group of settlers from Oklahoma to an area by the Athabasca River. For the first few years they had difficulties, as the climate was harsher than what they were used to in Oklahoma. They had both to clear and cultivate land for crops, and build their houses from the ground up. Most of the early ones were log cabins. The settlers were resilient and three quarters of the African Americans stayed on their land in Alberta long enough and developed it in order to secure their homestead patents, a higher percentage than of some other settlers groups.  They built a school house in 1913 and a nondenominational church in 1914. They developed a baseball team that was widely known in the north.

Amber Valley was the largest community of Black people in Alberta until the 1930s. It received a post office in 1931, when it officially established the name of the community. At that time the community had about 300 people, and supported a two-room schoolhouse. Because of a decline in population as people moved to cities and areas with more economic opportunity, the post office was closed in 1968.

Other primarily American Black settlements formed at this time were Junkins (now Wildwood), near Chip Lake; Keystone (now Breton), southwest of Edmonton; Campsie, near Barrhead; and Eldon, near Maidstone, Saskatchewan. From 1908 to 1911, about 1,000 African Americans settled in Alberta to homestead.

Beginning in the 1950s, many descendants of the original settlers began moving to near cities such as Edmonton to escape the rigors of rural life and have more economic opportunity. In Edmonton, Amber Valley descendants founded the Shiloh Baptist Church, one of the few Black churches in Western Canada.

Amber Valley is now considered a ghost town.

Original settlers
Willis Reese Bowen (also known as Willace Bowen) organized the original group of five families who moved from Oklahoma to Vancouver, and then to Amber Valley. Willace Bowen established a homestead that his son Obadiah Bowen continued to work. Obadiah replaced the first house with a brick one in 1938. The house and homestead, with outbuildings, has been preserved as Obadiah Place and honored for its historic provincial significance.

 John King and Stella King, parents of Violet King Henry, the first Canadian Black female attorney
 Willace Bowen, also recorded as Willis Reese Bowen
 Henry Parson Sneed
 Hazel Proctor
 J.D. Edwards

Notable people

 Oliver Bowen, grandson of Willace Bowen and engineer
 Cheryl Foggo, author, documentary film director, playwright
 Violet King Henry, descendant of settlers and the first Canadian Black female attorney
 Floyd Sneed (drummer for the 1960s -'70s pop music band Three Dog Night), descendant born in Calgary, related to Harrison Sneed

Popular interest 
 The community was the subject of the 1984 documentary film We Remember Amber Valley, directed by Selwyn Jacob.
 Esi Edugyan's debut novel, The Second Life of Samuel Tyne (2004), is set in the fictional town of Aster, based on this historic settlement.  It features a Ghanaian-Canadian civil servant from Calgary who moves his family there in 1968 after inheriting property.
 In 2021, the community was honoured with a Canada Post stamp.

References

Further reading
 Mathieu, Sarah-Jane. North of the Colour Line: Migration and Black Resistance in Canada, 1870-1955. Chapel Hill: The University of North Carolina Press, 2010.

External links 
 "Alberta's Black Pioneer Heritage", Alberta Online Encyclopedia 
 Allan Rowe, "African American Immigration to Alberta", RETROactive blog, Historic Resources Management Branch, Alberta
https://www.cbc.ca/newsinteractives/features/crossing-boundaries
 Article at thecanadianencyclopedia.ca

Black Canadian culture in Alberta
Populated places established by African Americans
Black Canadian settlements
History of Alberta by location
Localities in Athabasca County